Noah Hickey (born 9 June 1978) is a New Zealand former footballer who last played for Gisborne City in the Central Premier League and last played professionally for the New Zealand Knights in the Hyundai A-League. He plays as either a striker or a right-winger and was an established member of the New Zealand national team, the 'All Whites'.

Biography
He was the 1997 New Zealand Young Player of the Year, and has had trials with English teams Watford F.C. and Northampton Town F.C., perhaps due to his appearance in the 2003 Confederations Cup tournament. He also achieved numerous caps for the Eastern Suburbs first team, and was a regular goal scorer for the "White Demons".

Noah had a successful stint with Tampere United of Finland. He scored the goal that helped them win the league against MyPa, and also scored an infamous winner with his hand against rivals FC Haka.

He has presented a children's football show on Sky Sports in New Zealand. He is also infamous for missing an open goal in bizarre fashion, now featured on several 'bloopers' tapes. Noah Hickey has also appeared on NZ reality television show City Celebrity Country Nobody.

Noah's famous miss is featured in the football bloopers video "Nick Hancock's Football Hell". Noah is repeatedly referred to incorrectly as Noel Hickey during the remainder of the video (this is a mistake made by the commentator in the video clip, and not solely Hancock's error).

International career
Hickey made his full All Whites debut in a 0–1 loss to Papua New Guinea on 31 May 1997. He was included in the New Zealand side for the 2003 Confederations Cup finals tournament.

On 28 May 2007 Hickey surprised many by retiring from International and pro football exactly 10 years to the day of his first cap.
 There have been suggestions that this came about due to a fallout with New Zealand and Wellington Phoenix manager, Ricki Herbert. This followed New Zealand's disastrous results in South America which Herbert blamed on player fitness and commitment.

Hickey ended his international playing career with 33 A-international caps and 3 goals to his credit, his final cap came in a 0–5 loss to Venezuela on 28 March 2007.

He is now Running the New Zealand stage of "Red Bull Balls to the Wall"
A one on one competition with youth.

He was also the sports correspondent for More FM's nationwide drive show Josh and Tom, and had a weekly spot around about 6.30pm every Friday night.

Noah is also running schools programme run with AUT called Shine that aims to teach students not to worry about people knocking them when they are striving for their potential.

Career statistics

International goals

References

External links
 Noah Hickey Interview

 New Zealand Knights Profile

1978 births
Living people
Association footballers from Auckland
New Zealand Knights FC players
Tampere United players
New Zealand association footballers
New Zealand expatriate association footballers
New Zealand international footballers
Football Kingz F.C. players
Expatriate footballers in Finland
New Zealand expatriate sportspeople in Finland
Veikkausliiga players
A-League Men players
National Soccer League (Australia) players
Gisborne City AFC players
Association football wingers
2003 FIFA Confederations Cup players
2004 OFC Nations Cup players